The Voivodeasa is a left tributary of the river Toplița in Romania.

References

Rivers of Romania
Rivers of Harghita County